Teruyuki (written: 照幸, 照之 or 晃之) is a masculine Japanese given name. Notable people with the name include:

Teruyuki Hashimoto, Japanese mixed martial artist
, Japanese actor
, Japanese footballer
, Japanese karateka
, Japanese comedian, tarento and TV presenter

Japanese masculine given names